Statistics of Qatar Stars League for the 2003–04 season.

Overview
It was contested by 10 teams, and Al-Sadd Sports Club won the championship.

League standings

References
Qatar - List of final tables (RSSSF)

2003–04 in Asian association football leagues
2003–04 in Qatari football